Geru Siah (also Romanized as Gerū Sīāh; also known as Gerūsīā) is a village in Rahdar Rural District, in the Central District of Rudan County, Hormozgan Province, Iran. At the 2006 census, its population was 38, in 10 families.

References 

Populated places in Rudan County